The Netherlands national men's field hockey team represents the Netherlands in international men's field hockey and is controlled by the Koninklijke Nederlandse Hockey Bond, the governing body for field hockey in the Netherlands.

The Netherlands are one of the most successful teams in the world, having won the Summer Olympics twice, the Hockey World Cup three times, the Champions Trophy eight times, the EuroHockey Nations Championship six times and the Hockey World League once. At the 2020 Summer Olympics they reached their worst performance in 37 years at the Olympics as they failed to qualify for the semi-finals.

Tournament record

Sultan Azlan Shah Cup

Hockey World League

FIH Pro League

*Draws include knockout matches decided on a penalty shoot-out.

Team

Current squad
The following 18 players were named on 9 November 2022 for the 2023 World Cup from 13 to 29 January 2023 in Bhubaneswar and Rourkela, India.

Head coach: Jeroen Delmee

Recent call-ups
The following players have also been called up for the national team in the last 12 months.

Records

Players in bold are still active with the national team.

Most capped players

Top goalscorers

Notable players
Floris Evers
Guus Vogels
Marc Delissen
Remco van Wijk
Taeke Taekema
Teun de Nooijer
Taco van den Honert

See also
 Netherlands men's national under-21 field hockey team
 Netherlands women's national field hockey team

References

External links

FIH profile

Field hockey
European men's national field hockey teams
National team
Men's sport in the Netherlands